Liam Kay (born 17 December 1991) is an Ireland international rugby league footballer who plays on the  for Wakefield Trinity in the Betfred Super League.

He previously played for the Wakefield Trinity Wildcats in the Super League, and on loan from the Wildcats at Doncaster in the Kingstone Press Championship. Kay has also played for the Leigh Centurions in the Championship and the Toronto Wolfpack in the Championship and the Super League. He also spent time on loan from Toronto at Wakefield in the top flight.

Background
Kay was born in Leeds, West Yorkshire, England.

Career

Wakefield
Kay signed a professional contract at Wakefield Trinity Wildcats in 2012 as a halfback but was mostly played on the wing. He scored 7 tries for the Wakefield Trinity Wildcats in 5 appearances. In 2013 he was sent on dual registration to Doncaster where he played at both halfback but mostly on the wing as he had done at Wakefield. He scored 12 tries in 21 appearances for Doncaster before he returned to Wakefield where a hat-trick of tries against Castleford Tigers in the closing game of the 2013 season.

Leigh
In his first season with the club, they finished top of the league and won the Grand Final against Featherstone Rovers to win the Championship for the first time since 2004. In 2015 Kay equalled the record for most tries in a season by a Leigh  which was 36 as the Leigh Centurions again won the Championship title.

Toronto
Kay was the first-ever signing to play for the newly formed Canadian club, Toronto Wolfpack, for their inaugural season in 2017. Kay ended that season as the division's top try scorer. He was also named in the Ireland squad for the 2017 Rugby League World Cup.

In 2018 again Toronto Wolfpack would finish top of the championship and would enter the playoffs for a chance for promotion. Unfortunately Kay suffered an extremely complex injury in the first week of the play-offs, unfortunately that wasn't the first of the bad news for Toronto Wolfpack as they would later fail to reach the Super league losing to London Broncos In the Million Pound Game.

In 2019 Kay would miss the first few games due to the injury he sustained in August 2018. But he made his return on Canadian soil against Bradford Bulls. Again Toronto Wolfpack would finish top of the table and at last gain promotion to Super League with Kay firmly in the mix.

It's a testament to Kay and his dedication to the Toronto Wolfpack, he was the first ever signing for the club and he helped steer them From League 1 to Super League within 3 years. It's safe to say he has cemented his place in Toronto Wolfpack history.

Wakefield (II)
On July 16, 2020, Kay was loaned to Wakefield Trinity from the Toronto Wolfpack for the remainder of the 2020 Super League season, while also signing a two-year deal with the Trinity for 2021 & 2022.

Honours
Championship: 
Winner: 2014, 2015, 2016, 2018, 2019
League 1: 
Winner: 2017

References

External links

Toronto Wolfpack profile
(archived by web.archive.org) Wakefield Trinity Wildcats profile
2017 RLWC profile

1991 births
Living people
Doncaster R.L.F.C. players
English people of Irish descent
English rugby league players
Ireland national rugby league team players
Leigh Leopards players
Oxford Rugby League players
Rugby league wingers
Rugby league players from Leeds
Toronto Wolfpack players
Wakefield Trinity players